Iqbal Qadri (born 21 November 1948) is a Pakistani politician who had been a member of the National Assembly of Pakistan, from 2008 to May 2018. Previously he had been a member of the Provincial Assembly of Sindh from 2002 to 2007.

Early life and education
He was born on 21 November 1948.

He has the degree of Bachelor of Laws and Master of Arts.

Political career

Qadri is a lawyer by profession and has been a member of Muttahida Qaumi Movement (MQM) since 1992.

He was elected to the Provincial Assembly of Sindh as a candidate of MQM from Constituency PS-96 (Karachi-VIII) in 2002 Pakistani general election. He received 22,534 votes and defeated Amanullah Khan Niazi, a candidate of Muttahida Majlis-e-Amal (MMA).

He was elected to the National Assembly of Pakistan as a candidate of MQM from Constituency NA-241 (Karachi-III) in 2008 Pakistani general election. He received 93,617 voted and defeated Zarbali Syed, a candidate of Awami National Party (ANP).

He was re-elected to the National Assembly as a candidate of MQM from Constituency NA-241 (Karachi-III) in 2013 Pakistani general election. He received 95,584 votes and defeated Saeed Ahmed Afridi, a candidate of Pakistan Tehreek-e-Insaf (PTI).

References

Living people
Muttahida Qaumi Movement politicians
Pakistani MNAs 2013–2018
Politicians from Karachi
Muttahida Qaumi Movement MNAs
1948 births
Pakistani MNAs 2008–2013
Sindh MPAs 2002–2007